The Indian state of West Bengal is the site of India's first modern university and 33 universities are listed under the University Grants Commission (India).

Background
In West Bengal the medium of instruction in colleges and universities is usually in Bengali, English. Diploma, certificate courses, advanced diploma program, post graduate course and doctoral programs are offered. Research programs offered by the universities are conducted with the aid of specialized institute.

History

Early years
Kolkata, the capital of West Bengal has played a pioneering role in the development of the modern education system in India. Western models of education came to India through Kolkata. Many of the first schools and colleges were established by the missionaries and reformists. Sir William Jones (philologist) established the Asiatic Society in 1784 for promoting oriental studies. People like Ram Mohan Roy, David Hare, Ishwar Chandra Vidyasagar, Asutosh Mukherjee and William Carey played a leading role in the setting up of modern schools and colleges in the city. The Fort William College was established in 1800. The Hindu College was established in 1817, renamed the Presidency College in 1855.

William Carey established the Serampore College in the city of Serampore in 1818. It went on to become India's first modern university in 1827 when it was incorporated by a Royal Charter as a Danish University. The Sanskrit College was established in 1824. Reverend Alexander Duff of the Church of Scotland established the General Assembly's Institution in 1830 and later the Free Church Institution in 1844, which were later merged to form what is now known as the Scottish Church College, Calcutta. These institutions played a significant role in what came to be known as the Young Bengal Movement and the Bengal Renaissance. La Martiniere Calcutta was established in 1836.

The oldest medical school in Asia, the Calcutta Medical College was set up in 1835. In 1857, the University of Calcutta was established as the first full-fledged multi-disciplinary university in south Asia. It was modelled on the lines of the University of London. Today it is amongst the largest multidisciplinary universities of India and offers some of the widest number of academic disciplines for study.

John Bethune established a school for Indian girls in 1850 at a time when women's education was frowned upon in the society. The Bethune College for girls was set up by him in 1879.

In 1856 technical and engineering education came with the establishment of a civil engineering college / department. This setup went through various reorganisations to finally become the Bengal Engineering College in 1921. The Jesuit administered St Xavier's College was established in 1860.  Bengal Engineering and Science University is the second oldest engineering institutes in the country and it was started in the year 1864. They offer the following programs such as B.E, M.E, MCA, MBA, MSC, B. Arch. and Ph.D. programs. Apart from this they also provide part-time courses in the evening for the professionals.

The nation's first homoeopathy college was established in the city in 1880. In 1883 Kadambini Ganguly and Chandramukhi Basu became the first women graduates from the University of Calcutta. In the process, they became the first female graduates of the British Empire. Kadambini went on to become the first female physician trained in the Western system of medicine in South Asia.

20th century
In 1906, the partition of Bengal led to widespread nationalistic and anti-British feelings. This led to the setting up of the National Council of Education, Bengal.  The Science College was established in 1917. The first blind school came into being in 1925.

After independence, Calcutta continued to be in the forefront of the educational scene. The Government College of Art & Craft was established in 1951. The National Council of Education became the Jadavpur University in 1955.  The Rabindra Bharati University was established in 1962. This university offers courses in the fine and performing arts. The Indian Institute of Social Welfare and Business Management was set up in 1953 as the country's first management institute and is also the first in the country to offer an MBA degree of a university.  The first, Indian Institute of Technology was set up at Kharagpur about 120 km from Calcutta. In 1960 the Regional Engineering college (presently National Institute of Technology) at Durgapur was set up. It is amongst the top NITs in India and also among the oldest. Indian Institute of Management Calcutta, the first among the Indian Institutes of Management, was set up in 1961 at Joka. It was the first national institute for post-graduate studies and research in management sciences. It was established with the help of the MIT Sloan School of Management and the Ford Foundation.

Institute of Eminence (IoE) 
 Indian Institute of Technology Kharagpur
Jadavpur University

Central Universities

Institute of National Importance

Research Institutes

Deemed universities

National Law University

State Universities

Private Universities

List of medical colleges

List of colleges by districts

Dakshin Dinajpur
Balurghat College
Balurghat B.Ed College
Balurghat Mahila Mahavidyalaya
Jamini Majumdar Memorial College
Gangarampur College
Gangarampur Government Polytechnic
Gangarampur B.Ed College
Buniadpur Mahavidyalaya
Dewan Abdul Goni College

Darjeeling
Bijanbari College
Darjeeling Government College
Ghoom-Jorebunglow Degree College
Ghoshpukur College
Gyan Jyoti College
Inspiria Knowledge Campus
Kalipada Ghosh Tarai Mahavidyalaya
Kurseong College
Mirik College
Munshi Premchand Mahavidyalaya
Nakshalbari College
North Bengal Medical College
St Joseph's College, Darjeeling
Salesian College, Darjeeling
Salesian College, Siliguri
Siliguri College 
Siliguri College of Commerce
Siliguri Mahila Mahavidyalaya
Sonada Degree College
Southfield College, Darjeeling
Surya Sen Mahavidyalaya
Siliguri Institute of Technology
Indian Institute of Legal Studies

Kalimpong
Cluny Women's College
Kalimpong College
Rockvale Management College
Government General Degree College, Gorubathan
Government General Degree College, Pedong

Jalpaiguri 
 Ananda Chandra College, Jalpaiguri
Ananda Chandra College of Commerce
Dhupguri Girls' College
 Government College of Engineering, Jalpaiguri
 Maynaguri College, Maynaguri
Nani Bhattacharya Smarak Mahavidyalaya
North Bengal St. Xavier's College
P.D. Women's College
Parimal Mitra Smriti Mahavidyalaya
Rajganj College
Sukanta Mahavidyalaya
Jalpaiguri Law College

Cooch Behar
Acharya Brojendra Nath Seal College, Cooch Behar
Bakshirhat Mahavidyalaya
Baneswar Sarathibala Mahavidyalaya
Cooch Behar College
Dinhata College
 Government College of Physical Education for Women, Dinhata
Madhusudan Hore Mahavidyalaya, Nishigang
Mathabhanga College
Mekhliganj college
Netaji Subhas Mahavidyalaya
Sitalkuchi College
Thakur Panchanan Mahila Mahavidyalaya
Tufanganj Mahavidyalaya
University B.T. & Evening College
 Ghoksadanga Birendranath Mahavidyalaya
 Bakshirhat Mahavidyalaya
Dewanhat Mahavidyalaya
Cooch Behar Government Engineering College
Cooch Behar Polytechnic
8Uttar Banga Krishi Viswavidyalaya

Alipurduar
Alipurduar College, Alipurduar
Birpara College
Falakata College
Sahid Kshudiram Mahavidyalaya
Vivekananda College, Alipurduar 
Lilabati Mahavidyalaya
Pijushkanti Mukherjee Mahavidyalaya 
Samuktala Sidhu Kanhu College
Alipurduar Mahila Mahavidyalaya
Nani Bhattacharya Smarak Mahavidyalaya

Uttar Dinajpur
 Dr. Meghnath Saha College
 Islampur College
 Kaliyaganj College
 Raiganj Surendranath Mahavidyalaya
 Shree Agrasen Mahavidyalaya, Dalkhola
 Raiganj University
 Durgapur Women's College
 Chopra Kamala Paul Smriti Mahavidyalaya, Chopra

Malda
Chanchal College
Ghani Khan Choudhury Institute of Engineering & Technology
Gazole Mahavidyalaya
Gour Mahavidyalaya, Maldah
Government Teachers’ Training College, Malda
Harishchandrapur College
Kaliachak College
Kaliachak Government Polytechnic
Malda College
Malda Women's College
Manikchak College
Pakuahat Degree College
Samsi College
South Malda College
IMPS College of Engineering and Technology

Murshidabad
Sewnarayan Rameswar Fatepuria College, Beldanga
 Berhampore College
 Murshidabad College of Engineering & Technology, Baharampur
Krishnath College
Berhampore Girls' College
Kandi Raj College
Muzaffar Ahmed Mahavidyalaya, Salar, Bharatpur II
Sripat Singh College, Jiaganj
Rani Dhanya Kumari College, Jiaganj
Nagar College
Raja Birendra Chandra College
Sagardighi Kamada Kinkar Smriti Mahavidyalaya
Prof. Syed Nurul Hasan College
Raja Birendra Chandra College of Law
Hazi A. K. Khan College, Hariharpara
Jakir Hossain Polytechnic College,
Jangipur College
Dumkal Girls College
Murshidabad Adarsha Mahavidyalaya, Islampur
G D College, Shaikhpara
Dumkal College, Basantapur
Dumkal Institute of Engineering & Technology, Dumkal

Nadia
 Asannagar Madan Mohan Tarkalankar College
 Bethuadahari College
 Chakdaha College
 Chapra Bangaljhi Mahavidyalaya
 Chapra Government College
 Dr. B.R. Ambedkar College
 Dr. K.R. Adhikary College of Optometry & Paramedical Technology
 Dwijendralal College
 Global Institute of Management & Technology
 Haringhata Mahavidyalaya
 J.R.S.E.T. College of Law
 Kaliganj Government College
 Kalyani Mahavidyalaya
 Kalyani Technology Academy
 Karimpur Pannadevi College
 Krishnagar Government College
 Krishnagar Women's College
 Nabadwip Vidyasagar College
 Nakashipara Government College
 Plassey College
 Pritilata Waddedar Mahavidyalaya
 Ranaghat College
 Santipur College
 Snehangshu Kanta Acharya Institute Of Law
 Srikrishna College
 Sudhiranjan Lahiri Mahavidyalaya
 Tagore School of Rural Development & Agriculture
 Tehatta Government College
 Kalyani Government Engineering College
JIS College of Engineering, Kalyani
Muragachha government College, Muragachha.

Hooghly
 Sri Ramkrishna Sarada Vidyamahapitha
Saroj Mohan Institute of Technology, Guptipara
 Raja Peary Mohan College
 Tarakeswar Degree College, Hooghly
Rabindra Mahavidyalaya, Champadanga, Hooghly
 Hooghly Engineering and Technology College
 Hooghly Mohsin College
 Hooghly Women's College
 Serampore College, Serampore 
 Chandernagore Government College, Chandannagore
 Mahitosh Nandy Mahavidyalaya, Jangipara
 Bejoy Narayan Mahavidyalaya, Itachuna
 Nabagram Hiralal Paul College, Konnagar
Bidhan Chandra College, Rishra
Netaji Mahavidyalaya, Arambagh
Arambagh Girls' College, Arambagh
Sreegopal Banerjee College, Mogra
Aghorekamini Prakashchandra Mahavidyalaya, Bengai, Arambagh
Vivekananda Mahavidyalaya, Haripal, Haripal
Government General Degree College, Singur

Howrah
 Ramakrishna Mission Vidyamandira, Belur Math
 Bijoy Krishna Girls' College, Howrah
 Dinabandhu Institution, Howrah
 Narasinha Dutt College, Howrah
 Dr. Kanailal Bhattacharya College Ramrajatala, Howrah
 Lalbaba College, Howrah
 Azad Hind Fouz Smriti Mahavidyalaya, Domjur, Howrah
 Sovarani Memorial College, Jagatballavpur, Howrah
 Ramsaday College, Amta, Howrah
 Uluberia College, Uluberia, Howrah
 Bagnan College, Bagnan, Howrah
 Prabhu Jagatbandhu College, Andul, Howrah
 Shyampur Siddheswari Mahavidyalaya, Shyampur I
 Bagnan Teacher's Training College, Bagnan

Birbhum
 Birbhum Mahavidyalaya, Birbhum
 Suri Vidyasagar College, Birbhum
 Sambhunath College, Labpur
 Krishna Chandra College
 Bolpur College, Bolpur
 Purni Devi Chaudhuri Girls' College, Bolpur
 Rampurhat College, Rampurhat
 Hiralal Bhakat College, Nalhati
 Kabi Nazrul College, Murarai
 Sofia Girls College, Nalhati
 Asleha Girl's College, Nalhati
 Gurukul Teachers Training College, Rampurhat
 Helal B.Ed College, Math Kolitha, Nalhati
 Gitanjali College of Education, Lohapur
 Birbhum Pharmacy School, Dubarajpur

Bankura
 Bankura Unnayani Institute of Engineering
 Raipur Government Polytechnic
 Bankura Government Polytechnic
 Mallabhum Institute of Technology
 K.G. Engineering Institute
 Bankura Christian College
 Bankura Sammilani College
 Bankura Zilla Saradamani Mahila Mahavidyapith
 Jamini Roy College, Bankura
 Ramananda College, Bishnupur, Bankura
 Barjora College
 Panchmura Mahavidyalaya, Panchmura
 Pandit Raghunath Murmu Smriti Mahavidyalaya, Baragari
 Indas Mahavidyalaya, Indas, Bankura
 Raipur Block Mahavidyalaya
 Khatra Adibasi Mahavidyalaya
 Saldiha College
 Birsha Munda Memorial College
 Chatra Ramai Pandit Mahavidyalaya
 Chhatna Chandidas Mahavidyalaya
 Gobindaprasad Mahavidyalaya
 Onda Thana Mahavidyalaya
 Patrasayer Mahavidyalaya
 Saltora Netaji Centenary College
 Sonamukhi College
 Swami Dhananjoy Das Kathiababa Mahavidyalaya
 Government General Degree College, Mejia
 Akui Kamalabala Women's College
 Institute of Computer and Information Science

Purulia

 Sidho Kanho Birsha University, Purulia
Purulia Government Engineering College
J. K. College
Raghunathpur College
Manbhum Mahavidyalaya
Nistarini Women's College
Achhruram Memorial College, Jhalda, Purulia
Balarampur College
Ananda Marga College
Ananda Marga Gurukula Teacher's Training College

Paschim Bardhaman
 Banwarilal Bhalotia College, Ushagram Asansol
 Khandra College, Khandra
 Bidhan Chandra College, Burnpur Asansol
 Triveni Devi Bhalotia College, Raniganj, Asansol
 Asansol Polytechnic, South Dhadka, Asansol
 Kanyapur Polytechnic, Kanyapur, Asansol
 Nazrul Centenary Polytechnic, Chittaranjan, Asansol
 Asansol Engineering College, Asansol
 Asansol Girls' College, Asansol
 AYAN ARNAB SIKSHAN SANSTHA AJODHYA BONKATI, PANAGARH BURDWAN
 Deshbandhu Mahavidyalaya, Chittaranjan, Asansol
 NSHM Knowledge Campus, Durgapur
 Gupta College of Technological Sciences, Asansol
 Durgapur College of Commerce & Science, Durgapur
 Durgapur Government College
 Durgapur Women's College
 Bengal College of Engineering & Technology, Durgapur
 Dr. B. C. Roy engineering college, Durgapur
 NIM Durgapur 
 LAW COLLEGE DURGAPUR
 DURGAPUR INSTITUTE OF LEGAL STUDIES

Purba Bardhaman
 Vivekananda Mahavidyalaya, Bardhaman
 M. U. C. Women's College , Bardhaman
 Burdwan Medical College, Bardhaman
 University Institute of Technology,The University of Burdwan
 Burdwan Institute Management and Computer Science (BIMS), Bardhaman
 Burdwan Institute of medical and life sciences (BIMLS), Bardhaman
 Bardhaman Raj College
 AMEX an Institute of Professional Studies, Bardhaman
 M.B.C.Institute of Engineering and Technology, Bardhaman
 Syamsundar College, Burdwan - 713424
 Dr. Bhupendra Nath Dutta Smriti Mahavidyalaya, Bardhaman
 Gushkara Mahavidyalaya, Gushkara 
 Cyber Research & Training Institute, Bardhaman
 St. Xavier's College, Burdwan
 Dr. Gourmohan Roy College, Monteswar
 Galsi Mahavidyalaya, Galsi
 Sir Rashbehari Ghosh Mahavidyalaya, Ukhrid, Khandaghosh
 Achaya Sukumar Sen Mahavidyalaya, Gotan
 Memari College, Memari
 Katwa College, Katwa
 Khandra College, kandra
 Kalna College, Kalna
Dr. Gour Mohan Roy College, Monteswar, East Burdwan
Swami Vivekananda Institution for Teachers' Training, Kurmun, East Burdwan

Pashim Medinipur
 Keshiary Government College, Keshiary
 Belda College, Belda
Midnapore College, Medinipur
Raja Narendra Lal Khan Women's College, Medinipur
Kharagpur College, Kharagpur
Sukumar Sengupta Mahavidyalaya, Keshpur
Narajole Raj College, Narajole
Garhbeta College, Garhbeta College
 Gourav Guin Memorial College, Chandrakona
Debra Thana Sahid Kshudiram Smriti Mahavidyalaya, Debra
Santal Bidroha Sardha Satabarsiki Mahavidyalaya, Goaltore
Chandrakona Vidyasagar Mahavidyalaya, Chandrakona
 Institute of Science & Technology, Chandrakona
Pingla Thana Mahavidyalaya, Pingla
Sabang Sajanikanta Mahavidyalaya, Sabang
Bhatter College, Dantan
Indian Institute of Technology Kharagpur, Kharagpur

Jhargram
Sevayatan Sikshan Mahavidyalaya, Jhargram, Paschim Medinipur
Government General Degree College, Gopiballavpur-II, Beliaberah, Paschim Medinipur
Jhargram Raj College, Jhargram, Paschim Medinipur
Keshiary Government College
 Lalgarh Government College
 Nayagram Pandit Raghunath Murmu Government College
Sankrail Anil Biswas Smriti Mahavidyalaya
Seva Bharati Mahavidyalaya
Silda Chandra Sekhar College
Subarnarekha Mahavidyalaya
Vivekananda Satavarshiki Mahavidyalaya

Purba Medinipur
Prabhat Kumar College, Contai
Mugberia Gangadhar Mahavidyalaya, Bhagabanpur II, Contai
Deshapran Mahavidyalaya, Contai
Ramnagar College, Ramnagar II, Contai
Khejuri College, Khejuri, Contai
Egra Sarada Shashi Bhusan College, Egra
Bajkul Milani Mahavidyalaya, Bhagabanpur I, Egra
Yogoda Satsanga Palpara Mahavidyalaya, Patashpur, Egra
Haldia Government College, Haldia
Mahisadal Raj College, Mahisadal, Haldia
Mahishadal Girls College, Mahisadal, Haldia
Sitananda College, Nandigram, Haldia
Swarnamoyee Jogendranath Mahavidyalaya, Nandigram, Haldia
Vivekananda Mission Mahavidyalaya, Chaitanyapur, Haldia
Tamralipta Mahavidyalaya, Tamluk
Maharaja Nandakumar Mahavidyalaya, Nandakumar, Tamluk
Moyna College, Moyna, Tamluk
Rabindra Bharati Mahavidyalaya, Kolaghat, Tamluk
Shahid Matangini Hazra Government College for Women, Tamluk
Panskura Banamali College, Panskura, Tamluk
Siddhinath Mahavidyalaya, Panskura, Tamluk
Haldia Institute of Technology, Haldia

North 24 Parganas
 Acharya Prafulla Chandra College, New Barrackpore
 Adamas Institute of Technology, Barasat
 Adyapeath Annada Polytechnic College, Adyapeath, Dakshineswar
 Amdanga Jugal Kishore Mahavidyalaya, Sadhanpur-Uludanga, Amdanga, North 24 Parganas
 Banipur Mahila Mahavidyalaya, Habra
 Basirhat College, North 24 Parganas
 Barrackpore Rastraguru Surendranath College, North 24 Parganas
 Barasat College, Barasat
 Barasat Government College, Barasat
 Bhairab Ganguly College, Belgharia
 Chandraketugarh Sahidullah Smriti Mahavidyalaya, Berachampa
 Dinabandhu Mahavidyalay, Bongaon
 Dr.B.R. Ambedkar Satabarshiki Mahavidyalaya, Bagdah
 Gobardanga Hindu College, Gobardanga
 Gopal Chandra Memorial College of Education, New Barrackpore
 Hingalganj Mahavidyalay, Hingalganj
 Kanchrapara College, Kanchrapara
 Mahadevananda Mahavidyalaya, Barrackpore
 Morning Star College, Barrackpore
 Naba Barrackpore Prafulla Chandra Mahavidyalaya, New Barrackpore
 Nahata Jogendranath Mandal Smriti Mahavidyalaya, Nahata
 Narula Institute of Technology, Agarpara
 Panihati Mahavidyalay, Sodepur
 P.R. Thakur Govt College, Thakurnagar
 
 Rishi Bankim Chandra College, Naihati
 Sree Chaitanya College, Habra
 Sree Chaitanya Mahavidyalaya, Habra
 Vivekananda Centenary College, Rahara 
 Vivekananda College, Madhyamgram
 Regent Education and Research Foundation 
Elitte College of Engineering(BTech)
Elitte Institute of Engineering & Management(Polytecnic)
Kingstone Polytecnic College
AMS College of Polytecnic
Camellia Institute of Technology
Guru Nanak Institute of Technology*

South 24 Parganas
 Baruipur College
 L.J.D. College, Falta
 Magrahat College
 Budge Budge College
 Maheshtala College
 Fakir Chand College
 Sundarban Mahavidyalaya
 Shirakole Mahavidyalaya
 Dhruba Chand Halder College
 Gourmohan Sachin Mondal Mahavidyalaya
 Sushil Kar College
 Jibantala Rokeya Mahavidyalaya
 Raidighi College
 Sukanta College
 Sonarpur Mahavidyalaya
 Bankim Sardar College

Kolkata
 Acharya Jagadish Chandra Bose College, Kolkata
 Anandamohan College, Kolkata
 Asutosh College, Kolkata
  Brainware Group of Institutions
 B. P. Poddar Institute of Management & Technology
 Bangabasi College, Kolkata
 Basanti Devi College, Kolkata
 Bengal Institute of Technology, Kolkata
 Bethune College, Kolkata
 Bharatiya Vidya Bhavan Institute Of Management Science, Salt Lake, Kolkata
 Bhawanipur Education Society College, Kolkata
 Bidhan Nagar College, Salt Lake, Kolkata
Brahmananda keshab chandra college Bonhooghly, Dunlop, kolkata
 Calcutta Institute of Engineering and Management, Kolkata
 Calcutta National Medical College, Kolkata
 City College, Kolkata
 College of Engineering and Management, Kolaghat
 Derozio Memorial College
 Dinabandhu Andrews College, Kolkata
 Dum Dum Motijheel College
 Future Institute of Engineering and Management, Sonarpur, Kolkata
 Government College of Engineering and Ceramic Technology, Kolkata
 Government College of Art & Craft, Kolkata
 Heritage Institute of Technology, Kolkata
 International Management Institute, Kolkata, Kolkata 
 Institute of Engineering and Management
 Institute of Technology and Marine Engineering
 iLead, Kolkata
 Jogamaya Devi College, Kolkata
 Jogesh Chandra Chaudhuri Law College, Kolkata
 Lady Brabourne College, Kolkata
 Loreto College, Kolkata
 Marine Engineering and Research Institute
 Maulana Azad College, Kolkata
 Meghnad Saha Institute of Technology, Kolkata
 National Institute of Fashion Technology, Kolkata
National Institute of Planning Management, Kolkata 
 New Alipore College
 Netaji Nagar College for Women, Kolkata 
 Netaji Nagar Day College, Kolkata 
 Netaji Nagar College (Evening) 
 Netaji Subhash Engineering College
NIPS School of Hotel Management, Kolkata
Nopany Institute for Professional Studies, Kolkata
 Pailan College of Management & Technology, Joka
 Prasanta Chandra Mahalanobis Mahavidyalaya
 Rajabazar Science College, Kolkata
 Ramakrishna Mission Residential College, Narendrapur
 RCC Institute of Information Technology
 Sanaka Educational Trust Group Of Institutions
 Scottish Church College, Kolkata
 Sabita Devi Education Trust- Brainware Group Of Institutions
St. Paul's Cathedral Mission College
 St. Thomas college of Engineering & Technology, Kolkata
 St. Xavier's College, Calcutta, Kolkata
 Surendranath College, Kolkata
 Techno India, Salt Lake, Kolkata
 Techno India College of Technology, Rajarhat, Kolkata
 The Heritage Academy, Kolkata
Vivekananda College, Thakurpukur, Kolkata
Vivekananda College for Women, Barisha, Kolkata
 Vidyasagar College, Kolkata
 Vidyasagar College for Women, Kolkata
 Vijaygarh Jyotish Ray College, Kolkata 
 Victoria Institution (College)

References

Colleges and universities